Aghcheh Rud (also Romanized as Āghcheh Rūd; also known as Aga Jari, Āghjeh Rūd, Āqā Jarī, and Aqājri) is a village in Qaranqu Rural District, in the Central District of Hashtrud County, East Azerbaijan Province, Iran. At the 2006 census, its population was 364, in 91 families.

References 

Towns and villages in Hashtrud County